The 2022–23 Chicago State Cougars men's basketball team represented Chicago State University in the 2022–23 NCAA Division I men's basketball season. The Cougars, led by second-year head coach Gerald Gillion, played their home games at the Jones Convocation Center in Chicago, Illinois and  competed as an independent with no conference affiliation.

Previous season
The Cougars finished the 2021–22 season 7–25, 3–15 in WAC play to finish in a tie for 11th place. As the No. 10 seed in the Western Athletic Conference tournament, they were defeated by Utah Valley in the first round. 

The season marked the school's final year as a member of the WAC.

Roster

Schedule and results

|-
!colspan=12 style=| Regular season

Sources

References

Chicago State Cougars men's basketball seasons
Chicago State
Chicago State
Chicago State